Urmas Paet (born 20 April 1974) is an Estonian politician and Member of the European Parliament (MEP) from Estonia. He is a member of the Reform Party, part of the Alliance of Liberals and Democrats for Europe. He has served as Minister of Foreign Affairs from 2005 to 2014 and Minister of Culture from 2003 to 2005. He was a member of the Estonian Parliament from 2003 to 2014.

Education and early career
Urmas was born in Tallinn. He graduated from the University of Tartu in 1996 with a BA in political science and continued his graduate studies there, but without obtaining the degree. He was active in journalism during his studies, first at Estonian Radio and later at Postimees, a mainstream daily and one of Estonia's most popular newspapers.

Political career
Paet continued his career in journalism until 1999, when he entered politics by joining the Reform Party and becoming professional advisor.  He served as the Deputy Mayor of Nõmme (a district of Tallinn) from 1999 to 2003.

Role in Estonian politics
In April 2003, when the Juhan Parts government took office, Paet became Estonian Minister of Culture. In this capacity, he helped launch a new theatre, Theatre NO99

Paet remained in that position until April 2005, when the Parts government fell. In April 2005, when the Andrus Ansip cabinet took office, he became Foreign Minister.

During his time in office, the kidnapping of seven Estonian cyclists in the Beqaa Valley near the Syria-Lebanese border required Paet to undertake multiple trips to the Middle East in 2011; the cyclists’ release was secured after 113 days in captivity. By the time he left office, he was the second longest-serving foreign minister in Europe.

Member of the European Parliament, 2014–present
Paet has been a Member of the European Parliament since the 2014 European elections. A member of the ALDE (Group of the Alliance of Liberals and Democrats for Europe) political faction, he first served on the Committee on Budgets from 2014 until 2019. In this capacity, he authored a 2016 parliamentary resolution in favor of plans to increase European spending on military missions, as well as developing and sharing assets like helicopters.

Following the 2019 elections, Paet moved to the Committee on Foreign Affairs and its Subcommittee on Security and Defence. In addition to his committee assignments, he is a member of the parliament's delegation for relations with the countries of Southeast Asia and the Association of Southeast Asian Nations (ASEAN); the European Parliament Intergroup on the Digital Agenda; the European Parliament Intergroup on the Welfare and Conservation of Animals; and the European Parliament Intergroup on LGBT Rights. Also since 2019, he has been part of the Democracy Support and Election Coordination Group (DEG), which oversees the Parliament's election observation missions.

In 2015, Paet nominated murdered Russian politician Boris Nemtsov for the Sakharov Prize for Freedom of Thought.

In the 2015 Estonian elections, Paet received enough votes to take up a seat in the national parliament yet decided to keep his seat in the European Parliament.

Following the 2019 elections, Paet was part of a cross-party working group in charge of drafting the European Parliament's four-year work program on foreign policy.

Recognition
In March 2019, Paet was the recipient of the Security & Defence Award at The Parliament Magazine's annual MEP Awards.

Personal life
Paet is married and has three daughters. He speaks Estonian, German, Finnish, English and Russian.

References

External links
Foreign Minister's Homepage
Urmas Paet at Estonian Reform Party's website

|-

|-

1974 births
21st-century Estonian politicians
Estonian Reform Party MEPs
Estonian Reform Party politicians
Living people
Members of the Riigikogu, 2003–2007
Members of the Riigikogu, 2007–2011
Members of the Riigikogu, 2011–2015
Members of the Riigikogu, 2023–2027
MEPs for Estonia 2014–2019
MEPs for Estonia 2019–2024
Ministers of Culture of Estonia
Ministers of Foreign Affairs of Estonia
Politicians from Tallinn
Recipients of the Order of the National Coat of Arms, 3rd Class
University of Tartu alumni